NSW Marines may refer to
 the New South Wales Marine Corps which accompanied the First Fleet to Australia and was disbanded in 1791; or
 the New South Wales Marine Light Infantry which took part in the Boxer Rebellion in 1900–01.